Cyrano de Bergerac is a 1950 American adventure comedy film based on the 1897 French  verse drama Cyrano de Bergerac by Edmond Rostand. It uses  poet Brian Hooker's 1923 English blank verse translation as the basis for its screenplay. The film was the first motion picture version in English of Rostand's play, though there were several earlier adaptations in different languages.

The 1950 film was produced by Stanley Kramer and directed by Michael Gordon. José Ferrer received the Academy Award for Best Actor for his starring performance as Cyrano de Bergerac. Mala Powers played Roxane, and William Prince portrayed Christian de Neuvillette.

The film lapsed into the public domain in the mid-1980s. In 2022, the film was selected for preservation in the United States National Film Registry by the Library of Congress as being "culturally, historically or aesthetically significant."

Plot
In seventeenth-century Paris, poet and supreme swordsman Cyrano de Bergerac (José Ferrer) stops a play from being shown because he ostensibly cannot stand the bombastic style of the principal actor, Montfleury (Arthur Blake). An annoyed aristocratic fop, the Vicomte de Valvert (Albert Cavens), provokes him into a duel by tritely insulting Cyrano's enormous nose. Cyrano first mocks his lack of wit, improvising numerous inventive ways in which Valvert could have phrased it (much to the amusement of the audience). He then composes a ballade for the occasion on the spot and recites it during the sword fight. With the last line, he stabs his opponent.

Cyrano's friend Le Bret (Morris Carnovsky), Captain of the Gascony Guards, warns him he has made powerful enemies of his victim's friends, but he is unconcerned. When Le Bret presses him to reveal the real reason he hates Montfleury, Cyrano admits that he became jealous when he saw the actor smiling at his beautiful cousin Roxane (Mala Powers). He confesses that he is in love with her, but harbors no hope of it being returned because of his nose. When he receives a request from Roxane to see her in the morning, he is finally emboldened to act.

Then pastry chef and fellow poet Ragueneau (Lloyd Corrigan) approaches him for help. Ragueneau has learned that a nobleman he had mocked with his verses, the Comte De Guiche (Ralph Clanton), has hired a hundred ruffians to teach him a lesson. Cyrano escorts him, kills eight of the horde, and drives off the rest.

The next day, before he can tell Roxane of his feelings, she informs him that she has fallen in love with a handsome guardsman, Christian de Neuvillette (William Prince), though she has not even spoken to him. Cyrano hides his devastation and agrees to help her.

Cyrano befriends the young man, who is in Cyrano's guards' unit, and discovers that he is infatuated with Roxane, but is too inept with words to woo her. To help him, Cyrano composes Christian's love letters to Roxane, which she finds irresistible. Later, Christian decides he wants no more help and tries to speak to Roxane face to face, but fails miserably and she re-enters her house in an angry huff. Cyrano, hiding in the bushes, comes to his rescue, but this time by imitating Christian's voice and speaking to Roxane from under her balcony. He is so eloquent that he (unintentionally) wins a kiss for Christian from Roxane.

When the arrogant Comte De Guiche, who is also wooing Roxane, pressures her to marry him, Cyrano delays him long enough for her to wed Christian instead. Furious, De Guiche, Christian's commander, orders him to join his unit immediately for a war against the Spanish, preventing the couple from spending their wedding night together.

With Cyrano under his command as well, De Guiche earns the swordsman's respect by his conduct in the war. From the field, Cyrano sends Roxane letters every day, supposedly written by Christian. Roxane visits her husband in camp and tells him that she now has fallen in love with him not merely for his looks but because of his words, and would love him even if he were ugly. Realizing that she really loves Cyrano, Christian gets his rival to agree to tell Roxane the truth and let her decide between them. But before the opportunity arises, Christian volunteers for a dangerous mission and is fatally wounded, silencing Cyrano.

Roxane enters a convent in mourning. Years pass, with Cyrano visiting Roxane weekly, having retired from the military and writing satirical articles mocking the nobility. De Guiche, who has also befriended her and has come to respect Cyrano, has overheard a courtier plotting against Cyrano. De Guiche warns Roxane that Cyrano's life may be in danger. One night, Cyrano is lured into an ambush; the poet is run down by a carriage. Near death, he hides his injuries and goes to keep his appointment with Roxane for the last time. His secret love for Roxane is finally revealed when he recites from memory the last of his love letters, which she has kept, but it is too late. Cyrano first slips into delirium, then dies, leaving Roxane to mourn a second time.

Cast

 José Ferrer as Cyrano de Bergerac
 Mala Powers as Roxane
 William Prince as Christian de Neuvillette
 Morris Carnovsky as Le Bret
 Ralph Clanton as Antoine, Comte de Guiche
 Lloyd Corrigan as Ragueneau
 Virginia Farmer as Roxane's duenna
 Edgar Barrier as Cardinal Richelieu
 Elena Verdugo as the Orange Girl
 Albert Cavens as the Viscount de Valvert
 Arthur Blake as Montfleury
 Don Beddoe as The Meddler
 Percy Helton as Bellerose
 Francis Pierlot as Monk

Ferrer and Ralph Clanton had previously appeared in the 1946 Broadway revival of the play in the same roles that they would play in the film.

Production
The film was produced on a significantly lower budget than most costume dramas, because the producers were afraid that it would fail at the box office (it did). The sparseness of the sets is concealed by camera angles and by the lighting. Darkness is frequently used to hide the fact that the production design was not especially elaborate.

The film was one of the first to employ the then-new Western Electric magnetic sound recording system, which would become commonplace by 1953 and which was a necessity for stereo sound recording and reproduction.

Additions to the screenplay
The screenplay for the film, written by Carl Foreman, was mostly faithful to the play and to Brian Hooker's translation, though it was trimmed to 113 minutes (Cyrano plays for more than two-and-a-half hours onstage). However, Foreman did add his own dialogue for two or three additional scenes inserted into the film for better continuity between the five acts of the original play, and these are obviously not in verse.

The play characters of Le Bret and Carbon de Castel-Jaloux were combined, as were those of Ragueneau and Ligniere (although Ragueneau is not a drunk in the film). Le Bret consequently has a much larger and more important role in the film than in the play, and Ragueneau's role is slightly increased by his being the one threatened by a hundred ruffians that Cyrano fights off. The fight is shown in the film; in the play it takes place offstage between Acts I and II.

The role of the unnamed cardinal (Richelieu, to judge from his appearance) was specially written for the film.

In the film, Cyrano dies after being trampled by a carriage as part of an ambush rather than by being hit on the head by a falling log as in the play.  As with the fight against the hundred ruffians, the fatal attack on Cyrano is shown onscreen rather than taking place offstage (in the play it takes place between Acts IV and V). Previous to the attack, there is a new scene in the film in which his enemies are seen discussing the possibility of his being killed in a so-called "accidental" way.

Reception
If the film was decried for its low-budget, stagy look, as well as for some of its supporting actors, it was almost universally admired for Ferrer's star performance, in what is acknowledged to be his greatest role. The New York Times film critic Bosley Crowther praised Ferrer, stating that he "speaks the poetry of Rostand with richness and clarity such as only a few other actors have managed on the screen." However, he was less than impressed with Powers ("a lovely but lifeless girl"), Prince ("a solemn young dunce"), and Ferrer in his romantic moments, opining that "his maundering and mooning over Roxane is considerably hard to take."

Variety stated that "Michael Gordon's direction doesn't always fulfill the romantic, tragic, comedic and action possibilities, but permits a number of players to account for solid moments in a story that, essentially, belongs to one performer, Ferrer."  Time also  gave the film a mixed review. It called Ferrer "the very embodiment of Rostand's self-sacrificing, self-dramatizing hero" while deriding the play's "soft core of unblushing sentiment, unstinted gallantry, unending heroics".  However, it was more kind than Crowther to Powers ("uniformly good support") and Prince ("does well as the tongue-tied Christian").

The movie recorded a loss of $300,000. On Rotten Tomatoes, Cyrano de Bergerac holds a rating of 75% from 28 reviews.

Awards and honors

The film is recognized by the American Film Institute in these lists:
 2002: AFI's 100 Years...100 Passions – Nominated

See also
 List of films in the public domain in the United States

References

External links

 
 
 
 
 
 

1950 films
1950s romance films
American black-and-white films
American swashbuckler films
1950s English-language films
Films scored by Dimitri Tiomkin
Films based on Cyrano de Bergerac (play)
Films directed by Michael Gordon
Films featuring a Best Actor Academy Award-winning performance
Films featuring a Best Drama Actor Golden Globe winning performance
Films set in the 1640s
Films set in the 1650s
Films set in France
1950s adventure comedy films
United Artists films
Films with screenplays by Carl Foreman
Films produced by Stanley Kramer
Articles containing video clips
Cultural depictions of Cardinal Richelieu
Biographical films about writers
1950s American films
United States National Film Registry films